Evelyn Lucille Newman (née Lightfoot, July 24, 1915 – October 10, 2003) was an American film and music editor. She was twice nominated for the Academy Award for Best Film Editing in 1968 for Wild in the Streets, and in 1976 for Two-Minute Warning.

Selected filmography (as editor)
No Small Affair (1984)
Two-Minute Warning (1976)
Little Cigars (1973)
Bloody Mama (1970)
Angel, Angel, Down We Go (1969)
Wild in the Streets (1968)
Fireball 500 (1967)
C'mon, Let's Live a Little (1967)
The Ghost in the Invisible Bikini (1966)
Sergeant Deadhead (1965)
Beach Blanket Bingo (1965)
How to Stuff a Wild Bikini (1965)
Pajama Party (1964)
Bikini Beach (1964)
Muscle Beach Party (1964)

References

1915 births
2003 deaths
American women film editors
American film editors
21st-century American women